Balatonszárszó is a village along the southern shore of Lake Balaton in Somogy county, Hungary.

The settlement is part of the Balatonboglár wine region.

Gallery

Notable residents 
 Attila József (1905-1937), Hungarian poet
 Gyula J. Obádovics (born 1927), Hungarian mathematician, Dr. Techn., Dr. Rer. nat., professor emeritus
 Tivadar Farkasházy (born 1945), Hungarian humorist, author, and journalist

External links 
 Street map (Hungarian)
 Street map (Google)

References 

Populated places in Somogy County